Büşra Kuru (born 24 October 2001) is a footballer who plays as a midfielder for 2. Frauen-Bundesliga club, SC Sand, and the Turkey women's national team.

Born in Germany, she represents Turkey at international level.

Private life
Büşra Kuru was born to Turkish parents in Weinheim, Baden-Württemberg, Germany, on 24 October 2001. She studied at  Wirtschaftsgymnasium (Johann-Philipp-Reis Schule) in Weinheim.

Playing career
Kuru began playing football at age six. She was encouraged by her footballer brother, who took her to the sports field every day. Before she started playing, she pursued the hobbies of swimming and judo. She was part of the Baden selection team from 2011–12 to 2014–15, and in the Southwest selection team since the 2017–18 season.

Club
Kuru played for her hometown club SG Hohensachen, where she scored 20 goals in the league and cup matches of the 2014–15 season. The following season, she moved to TSG 1899 Hoffenheim. She plays for 1. FFC 08 Niederkirchen in the 2. Frauen-Bundesliga. In the next season, she transferred to 2. Frauen-Bundesliga–South.

International

Turkey girls' national U17 team
Kuru became a member of the Turkey girls' national under-17 team, debuting in the friendly match against Russia on 25 January 2017. She took part at the 2017 UEFA Development Tournament in three of the 2018 UEFA Women's Under-17 Championship qualification - Group 7 matches and three games at the Elite round - Group 6. She was capped 21 times and scored one goal in total for the Turkey girls' under-17 team between 2017 and 2018.

Turkey women's national U19 team
In 2018, Kuru was called up to the Turkey women's under-19 team, and played for the first time in a friendly game against Poland on 28 August. She took part in three matches of the 2019 UEFA Women's Under-19 Championship qualification - Group 2 and Elite round - Group 6 each. She played in 15 matches between 2018 and 2019.

Turkey women's national team
Kuru was selected for the Turkey women's team in 2020. She made her debut in the UEFA Women's Euro 2021 qualifying Group A match against Slovenia on 18 September 2020.

References

2001 births
Living people
People from Weinheim
Sportspeople from Karlsruhe (region)
German people of Turkish descent
Citizens of Turkey through descent
Turkish women's footballers
Women's association football midfielders
Turkey women's international footballers
German women's footballers
Footballers from Baden-Württemberg
1. FFC 08 Niederkirchen players